The Northfield Community Schools is a community public school district that serves students in kindergarten through eighth grade from the City of Northfield, in Atlantic County, New Jersey, United States.

As of the 2018–19 school year, the district, comprising two schools, had an enrollment of 919 students and 82.9 classroom teachers (on an FTE basis), for a student–teacher ratio of 11.1:1.

The district is classified by the New Jersey Department of Education as being in District Factor Group "DE", the fifth-highest of eight groupings. District Factor Groups organize districts statewide to allow comparison by common socioeconomic characteristics of the local districts. From lowest socioeconomic status to highest, the categories are A, B, CD, DE, FG, GH, I and J.

Students in ninth through twelfth grades attend Mainland Regional High School, which serves students from Linwood, Northfield and Somers Point. The high school is located in Linwood. For the 1997-98 school year, Mainland Regional High School was recognized by the United States Department of Education as a National Blue Ribbon School. As of the 2018–19 school year, the high school had an enrollment of 1,226 students and 112.0 classroom teachers (on an FTE basis), for a student–teacher ratio of 10.9:1.

Awards and recognition
SETDA, the State Educational Technology Directors Association, named the Middle School as the winner of its Student Voices Award, which honors "an outstanding K-12 school or district that has leveraged technology to dramatically improve the educational experiences and achievement of their students." Northfield was praised for "redesigning their school setting to invite innovative learning anywhere and anytime. Modeled from the d. School at Stanford University, the school implemented new furniture, whiteboards, bikes, turtles, and more ... Overall, this school has been transformed to a new digital learning environment that provides hands-on experiences for all learners."

In 2016, Principal Glenn Robbins was recognized by the National Association of Secondary School Principals as one of three top national Digital Principals for the innovative Design Thinking and Idea Street concepts in the Northfield Middle School.

Karen Schroeder (nee Weeks/Casselman), 7th grade math teacher at Northfield Community School, was named the 2009/2010 Atlantic County Teacher of the Year. 

Northfield Community School was named one of eight New Jersey Schools of Character.

In 2008, Northfield Community School was named the Healthiest School in Atlantic County in AtlantiCare's Healthy Schools contest.

Schools
Schools in the district (with 2018–19 enrollment data from the National Center for Education Statistics) are:
Elementary school
Northfield Community Elementary School with 505 students in grades K-4
Maureen Vaccaro, Principal
Middle school
Northfield Community Middle School with 409 students in grades 5-8
Kevin Morrison, Principal

Administration
Core members of the district's administration are:
Pedro D. Bretones, Superintendent
Linda Albright, Business Administrator

Board of education
The district's board of education, with nine members, sets policy and oversees the fiscal and educational operation of the district through its administration. As a Type II school district, the board's trustees are elected directly by voters to serve three-year terms of office on a staggered basis, with three seats up for election each year held (since 2012) as part of the November general election.

References

External links
Northfield Community Schools

School Data for the Northfield Community Schools, National Center for Education Statistics
Mainland Regional High School website

Northfield, New Jersey
New Jersey District Factor Group DE
School districts in Atlantic County, New Jersey